Scott S. Thomson (born November 12, 1968) is an American baseball coach. He played college baseball at Old Dominion, earning Virginia College Baseball Player of the Year as a senior in addition to numerous other awards. He played professionally for two seasons with the Erie Sailors before turning to coaching.   He then served as the head baseball coach of the Mount St. Mary's Mountaineers (1998–2020).

Head coaching record

Below is a table of Thomson's yearly records as a collegiate head baseball coach.

References

External links

1968 births
Living people
McDaniel College alumni
McDaniel Green Terror baseball coaches
Mount St. Mary's Mountaineers baseball coaches
Old Dominion Monarchs baseball players
People from Westminster, Maryland
Erie Sailors players